The 2015–16 Chicago Blackhawks season was the 90th season for the National Hockey League franchise that was established on September 25, 1926. They entered the season as defending Stanley Cup champions having won the Stanley Cup the previous season, their third championship in six years. The Blackhawks finished the season with 103 points to finish in third place in the Central Division, only six points behind the Western Conference-leading Dallas Stars. They lost in the first round of the Stanley Cup playoffs to the St. Louis Blues in seven games.

Patrick Kane led the Blackhawks with 46 goals and 106 points, both career highs. He was named the winner of the Hart Memorial Trophy as most valuable player in the NHL, becoming the first US-born player to receive the award. The Blackhawks had four players who scored 20 or more goals: Kane, Artemi Panarin (30), Jonathan Toews, and (28) Artem Anisimov (22). Goalie Corey Crawford led the Blackhawks with 35 wins. Artemi Panarin received the Calder Memorial Trophy as rookie of the year.

Off-season
The Blackhawks faced an off-season of change after being crowned Stanley Cup Champions for a third time in six years. Coming into the offseason, it was well known Chicago was facing impending cap space struggles and moves would need to be made.

On June 27, Chicago traded backup goaltender Antti Raanta to the New York Rangers in exchange for AHL forward Ryan Haggerty. Two days after the trade, defenseman David Rundblad received a two-year, $2 million contract extension on June 29.

The Blackhawks attempted to negotiate a contract for restricted free agent winger Brandon Saad who was a restricted free agent, but were unsuccessful. Unlikely to match any sizeable offer sheets due to cap constraints, Chicago traded Saad to the Columbus Blue Jackets. Chicago sent Saad and prospects Michael Paliotta and Alex Broadhurst to Columbus in exchange for center Artem Anisimov, wingers Jeremy Morin and Corey Tropp, as well as prospect Marko Dano and their 2016 4th round pick. Anisimov subsequently signed a five-year, $22.75 million contract with the Blackhawks. The move did not sit well with the Chicago fanbase, as Saad was viewed as another top young player on the Stanley Cup-winning squad, even though Anisimov would score 42 points for the Blackhawks in 2015–16.

Chicago turned to Russia a few times throughout the off-season. Kontinental Hockey League winger Viktor Tihkonov signed a one-year, $1.04 million contract with Chicago on July 1. Tihkonov was returning to the NHL for the first time since his 2009 season with the Phoenix Coyotes. Also, Chicago and Edmonton swapped minor league players, sending goaltender Anders Nilsson to the Oilers in exchange for forward Liam Coughlin.

Following season-long trade speculation, the Blackhawks pulled the trigger on another trade by trading another piece of its core Stanley Cup winning teams. Another cap clearing move, Chicago traded alternate captain Patrick Sharp and defenseman Stephen Johns to the Dallas Stars in exchange for forward Ryan Garbutt and defenseman Trevor Daley. A three-time Stanley Cup winner, Sharp carried a cap hit of $5.9 million in each of the next two seasons, limiting the Blackhawks in what they could do with free agency. A trade was expected following a down year in terms of production and the large aforementioned cap hit.

Forward Andrew Desjardins returned on a two-year contract worth $1.6 million, taking less to stay in Chicago. Theteam also extended the contracts of defensemen Viktor Svedberg, forward Marcus Kruger, and defenseman Michal Rozsival. They lost forwards Brad Richards and Antoine Vermette, as well as defenseman Johnny Oduya during free agency.

Season notes
The Blackhawks began their title defense with and average month of October. The Blackhawks went 6–5–0. However, fortunes increased in November (7–3–1) and December (9–5–1). The Blackhawks finished December on two game winning streak, looking to keep the wins coming in 2016. The Blackhawks did just that, winning the first 10 games of January to bring the win streak to 12 games. The streak set a franchise record for consecutive wins. The streak tied the Florida Panthers win streak earlier in the season for the longest winning streak in the NHL that season.

Standings

Schedule and results

Pre-season

Regular season

Detailed records

Playoffs

Player statistics
Final stats

Skaters

Goaltenders

†Denotes player spent time with another team before joining Blackhawks. Stats reflect time with Blackhawks only.
‡Left team mid-season. Stats reflect time with Blackhawks only.

Awards and honours

Awards

Milestones

Transactions
The Blackhawks were involved in the following transactions during the 2015–16 season.

Trades
 
Notes
Pittsburgh to retain 33% ($1.125 million) of salary as part of trade.
Winnipeg to retain 36% ($1.584 million) of salary as part of trade.
Chicago to retain 50% ($1.125 million) of salary as part of trade.
Los Angeles to retain 15% ($225,000) of salary as part of trade.

Free agents acquired

Free agents lost

Claimed via waivers

Lost via waivers

Lost via retirement

Player signings

Suspensions/fines

Draft picks

Below are the Chicago Blackhawks' selections at the 2015 NHL Entry Draft, to be held on June 26–27, 2015 at the BB&T Center in Sunrise, Florida.

Draft notes

 The Chicago Blackhawks' first-round pick went the Arizona Coyotes as the result of a trade on February 28, 2015, that sent Antoine Vermette to Chicago in exchange for Klas Dahlbeck and this pick.
 The Chicago Blackhawks received the 24th pick of this round (54th overall) as compensation for not signing 2010 first-round draft pick Kevin Hayes.
The Chicago Blackhawks' second-round pick went to the Philadelphia Flyers as the result of a trade on February 27, 2015, that sent Kimmo Timonen to Chicago in exchange for a conditional fourth-round pick in 2016 and this pick.
 The Los Angeles Kings' sixth-round pick went the Chicago Blackhawks as the result of a trade on July 16, 2013 that sent Daniel Carcillo to Los Angeles in exchange for this pick (being conditional at the time of the trade). The condition – Chicago will receive a sixth-round pick in 2015 if Carcillo plays less than 40 games with Los Angeles during the 2013–14 NHL season – was converted on January 4, 2014, when Carcillo was traded to the New York Rangers after playing only 26 games with the Kings.

References

Chicago Blackhawks seasons
Chicago Blackhawks season, 2015-16
Chicago Blackhawks
Chicago Blackhawks